Alfred Dunmore (1 January 1911 – 1991) was an English professional footballer who made one Football League appearance for Southampton in 1932.

Football career
Dunmore was born in South Shields and was educated at Stanhope Road School, representing County Durham Schools, before joining local club, Simonside, in 1928. He was soon recruited by Newcastle United, firstly joining their third team, before signing a professional contract for the first team in 1928. He failed to make a first-team appearance for Newcastle and moved on to Derby County in April 1930.

Still not having made a League appearance, he joined Southampton, of the Football League Second Division in June 1932. He made his only first-team appearance when he replaced Dick Neal as outside right for the match against West Ham United on 24 September 1932. The match was won 4–3, with a hat-trick from Johnny Arnold. Dunmore spent the remainder of his time at the Saints in the reserves, scoring nine goals in 47 matches.

At the end of the season, he was released from his contract and he wound up his career at Mansfield Town.

References

External links
Career details on www.11v11.com

1911 births
1991 deaths
Footballers from South Shields
English footballers
Newcastle United F.C. players
Derby County F.C. players
Southampton F.C. players
Mansfield Town F.C. players
English Football League players
Association football forwards